Robert Strauß (born 7 October 1986) is a German former professional footballer who played as a midfielder. He played for FC Augsburg, FC Erzgebirge Aue and 1. FC Heidenheim before retiring in 2020. He now works with the board of directors at 1. FC Heidenheim.

Notes

German footballers
FC Augsburg players
FC Erzgebirge Aue players
1. FC Heidenheim players
People from Oettingen in Bayern
Sportspeople from Swabia (Bavaria)
2. Bundesliga players
3. Liga players
1986 births
Living people
Association football midfielders
Footballers from Bavaria
1. FC Heidenheim non-playing staff